Leye County is a county in the northwest of Guangxi Zhuang Autonomous Region, China. It is under the administration of Baise city.

Climate

Discoveries 

 In May 2022, a team of cave explorers discovered a giant sinkhole with hidden forest in Leye County, China.

See also
 List of UNESCO Global Geoparks in Asia

References

External links

Counties of Guangxi
Counties and cities in Baise